This is a list of Russian desserts. Russian cuisine is a collection of the different cooking traditions of the Russian people. The cuisine is diverse, as Russia is by area the largest country in the world. Russian cuisine derives its varied character from the vast and multi-cultural expanse of Russia.

Russian desserts

 Blini (blintz)
 Chak-Chak
 Charlotte
 Chocolate-covered prune
 Curd snack
 Gogol mogol (kogel mogel)
 Khvorost (angel wings)
 Guriev porridge
 Hematogen
 Kissel
 Kulich
 Kutia
 Medovik (a layered honey cake)
 Napoleon (mille-feuille)
 Oladyi
 Paskha
 Pastila (a traditional Russian fruit confectionery)
 Pirog
 Pirozhki
 Ponchiki or Pyshka
 Pryanik
 Tula pryanik
 Vyazma pryanik
 Ptichye moloko ("bird's milk")
 Sunflower Halva
 Sushki
 Syrniki
 Trubochka (torpedo dessert)
 Varenye
 Vatrushka 
 Zefir

Gallery

See also

 List of desserts
 List of Russian dishes

References

 
Russian
Desserts
Lists of foods by nationality